The novels in the Umineko When They Cry series are written by Ryukishi07, and are based on the visual novel series of the same name by 07th Expansion. Kodansha Box started releasing novelizations of the visual novel arcs in July 2009 with Legend of the golden witch. Each arc is divided into two volumes, except for the last arc which is a single volume, illustrated by Tomohi. There are fifteen volumes in total.

Volume list

References

External links
 

Lists of novels